Burgwall is a word of German origin, literally meaning "fort rampart", and may refer to:

 Gord (archaeology), a typical Slavic settlement type of the High Middle Ages, sometimes called a Slavic burgwall
 Burgwall, the local term for a pre- and early historic hillfort in the non-Slavic areas of Central Europe
 Burgwall, a village in the borough of Zehdenick in Oberhavel district, Germany

See also
 Wallburg (disambiguation)